Two submarines of the United States Navy have been named USS Turbot for the turbot, a large, brown and white flatfish, valued as a food.

  was a G-class submarine which served before World War I. She was renamed G-3 before she was launched.
  was a  that had not been completed at the end of World War II.

United States Navy ship names